Hello Darling is a 2017 comedy drama play. The play is produced and directed by Yogesh Sanghvi and written by Mir Muneer.

Plot
A husband and wife must have trust one another and should not be unfaithful to each other. This is the message given to the audience through this drama in a very comic way.

Starring 
 Sheeba
 Shaad Randhawa
 Payal Goga Kapoor
 Sonia Birje
 Vindu Dara Singh

References 

 Sonia Birje Joins Comedy Play Hello Darling 
 Hello Darling Hindi Play Preview
 Cousins Shaad Randhawa and Vindu Dara Singh Come Together for Play Hello Darling 
 Double Bonanza for Vindhu Dara Singh 

Indian plays
2017 plays